Timothy Arthur Barrow (January 30, 1934 – March 16, 2019) was an American politician.

Biography 
Barrow was born in Franklin, Pennsylvania, and moved to Arizona in his childhood. He attended the New Mexico Military Institute and served in the United States Army overseas in West Germany. When he returned to the United States, he was a trust officer at a bank, and director of a hospital. He was elected as a Republican to the Arizona House of Representatives in 1966, and served until his election as Mayor of Phoenix in 1973. During his term in the House, he sat on the Ways and Means Committee, and had stints as majority whip (1969) and Speaker of the House (1971). He was elected as Mayor of Phoenix in 1973, and served one term. He later attended the John F. Kennedy School of Government and worked as a consultant.

Barrow died on March 16, 2019.

References

Mayors of Phoenix, Arizona
1934 births
2019 deaths
Businesspeople from Phoenix, Arizona
People from Franklin, Pennsylvania
Military personnel from Pennsylvania
Harvard Kennedy School alumni
Speakers of the Arizona House of Representatives
Republican Party members of the Arizona House of Representatives
20th-century American businesspeople